Reap the whirlwind may refer to:

Literature 
 Hosea 8:7: "For they have sown the wind, and they shall reap the whirlwind."
 Reap the Whirlwind (Star Trek novel), a 2007 Star Trek: Vanguard novel by David Mack
 Reap the Whirlwind, a 1989 The Sword of Knowledge novel by C. J. Cherryh and Mercedes Lackey
 Reap the Whirlwind, a 1968 memoir by Geoffrey Bing
 Reap the Whirlwind, a 1994 Plainsmen Series novel by Terry C. Johnston

Other media 
 "Reap the Whirlwind" (Traders), an episode of Traders.
 Reap the Whirlwind (adventure), a 1987 supplement for the RPG Marvel Super Heroes.
 "You called down the thunder, now reap the whirlwind", a voice line from the Terran Ghost unit from StarCraft: Brood War by Blizzard Entertainment.
Sir Arthur Harris' speech in which he explains his bombing campaign against Nazi Germany.

See also
 Reaping the Whirlwind (disambiguation)